Tronzano Lago Maggiore is a comune (municipality) in the Province of Varese in the Italian region Lombardy, located about 80 km northwest of Milan and about 30 km north of Varese, on the border with Switzerland.

Tronzano Lago Maggiore borders the following municipalities: Brissago (Switzerland), Cannobio, Maccagno con Pino e Veddasca.

Demographic evolution

References

Cities and towns in Lombardy